Giami (also Romanized as Gīāmī, Geyāmey, and Gīyāmī; also known as Kīāmey) is a village in Abravan Rural District, Razaviyeh District, Mashhad County, Razavi Khorasan Province, Iran. At the 2006 census, its population was 450, in 115 families.

References 

Populated places in Mashhad County